Alliance is the 39th full-length studio album by heavy metal, power metal band Thor, released through Deadline Music in 2020. It features several guest performers, such as John Gallagher (Raven), Björn Strid (Soilwork), Chris Holmes (Chris Holmes/Mean Men, Ex-W.A.S.P.), Ross "the Boss "Friedman (Ross the Boss Band, Ex-Manowar), Nina Osegueda (A Sound of Thunder), Fang VonWrathenstein (Lords of the Trident), Dan Cleary (Striker), Neil Turbin (Anthrax), and Danko Jones.

The album's first single, "The Ultimate Alliance", was released on June 9, 2021. The song features guitar solos from Chris Holmes, Ross the Boss, and John Leibel, as well as additional vocals by Nina Osegueda (A Sound of Thunder) and Fang VonWrathenstein (Lords of the Trident). A music video directed by Josh Grambo was also made to accompany the song.

Reception
The album has received positive reviews from critics. 

A review from Now Spinning Magazine gave a positive review, stating that "Thor still knows how to perform, on record as much as on stage, and that this album has lots to love." Concluding with saying how it's "Rocking, entertaining, and wonderful listening." Adam McCann of Metal Digest gave a mixed review of the album, saying that "While ultimately, it isn't actually the best, the guest spots stop this album from being relatively dull, and it shows that Thor is a better writer than a musician." Ending with that "'Alliance' is, however, a lot better than Thor's recent output and if you're the sort of person who doesn't need much encouragement to slip on a loincloth and pick up that Broadsword then it'll do the trick."

Track listing

Tracks 13-17 omitted from 12" vinyl release due to length restrictions.

Personnel
Band
Thor – vocals
John Leibel – lead guitar
Matt Hamilton – rhythm guitar
Kevin Stuart Swain – guitar, bass
Ted Jedlicki – bass
Tom Croxton – drums
Richard Fabio – drums

Session members
John Gallagher (Raven) – additional vocals (track 1)
Björn Strid (Soilwork) – additional vocals (track 2)
Fang VonWrathenstein (Lords of the Trident) – additional vocals (track 3)
Nina Osegueda (A Sound of Thunder) – additional vocals (track 3)
Dan Cleary (Striker) – additional vocals (track 4)
Neil Turbin (Anthrax) – additional vocals (track 5)
Danko Jones – additional vocals (track 7)
Trevor William Church (Haunt) – additional vocals (track 11)
Sean Peck (Death Dealer, Three Tremors, Cage) – additional vocals (track 12)
Chris Holmes (Chris Holmes/Mean Men, Ex-W.A.S.P.) – guitars (track 3)
Ross "the Boss "Friedman (Ross the Boss Band, Ex-Manowar) – guitars (track 3)
Frank Soda (The Imps) – guitars (track 8)
Frank Meyer (The Streetwalkin' Cheetahs) – guitars (track 10)
Dennis Post (Warrior Soul) – guitars (track 10)
Joey Killingsworth (Joecephus & The George Jonestown Massacre) – guitars (track 13)
Martin Gummesson (Thundermaker) – guitars (track 14)
Al Harlow (Prism) – guitars (track 15)
Joey Roads (Roadrash) – guitars (track 16)
Sheldon Byer (Roadrash) – guitars

Production staff
Ted Jedliki – engineering 
Andrew Oltmanns – engineering 
Mark Bridge – engineering 
Todd Olso – engineering 
Matt Hamilton – engineering 
Will Maravelas – engineering 
Achim Koehler – mastering, mixing
Scott Young – mixing
Frank Meyer – mixing, engineering, recording
Jon Mikl Thor – executive producer
Kevin Stuart Swain – engineering, producer
Ted Jedliki – production co-ordinator

References

External links

2021 albums
Thor (band) albums